Diapheromera covilleae, the creosote bush walkingstick, is a species of stick insect in the  family Diapheromeridae. They have small eyes and horn-like spines on the head and anus. Since they do not have wings, they travel by walking along branches of trees and bushes, sometimes walking along the ground in search for the next perch or food source. Females are usually  longer than males and have a larger body. Females are also grey in color while males are more brown.

Creosote bush walkingsticks are herbivores, feeding on creosote bush leaves, chunari leaves, and various other plants. Common predators of the walkingsticks include birds and lizards. Creosote bush walkingsticks are fairly common, but because they are nocturnal and very well camouflaged, they are hard to spot. They inhabit deserts and cactus forests. They are found in the Sonoran Desert, which extends throughout much of the Southwestern United States and Northwestern Mexico.

Other information
The creosote bush walkingstick only moves and feeds at night. It has four mandibles in front of its compound eyes that can grab and chew leaves while still giving the insect perfect vision of its surroundings.

References

External links
 http://bugguide.net/node/view/93389
 http://www.arizonensis.org/sonoran/fieldguide/arthropoda/diapheromera_covilleae.html

Phasmatodea
Insects of North America
Insects described in 1909